Dana Podracká (born 9 March 1954) is a Slovak writer. She is considered one of the leading women poets in Slovakia.

She was born in Banská Štiavnica and was educated there, going on to study psychology at Comenius University. Podracká worked at the Psychological Institute and as an editor at the Slovenský spisovateľ publishing house. In 1991, she began work for the weekly literary journal Literárny týždenník, later becoming deputy chief editor.

She published her first collection of poetry Mesačná milenka (Moon lover) in 1981; it received the Ivan Krasko Prize for best new work. Her poems have appeared in translation in various literary journals and anthologies.

Awards
She received the Witold Hulewicz Prize in 2004.

Selected works 
 Rubikon (Rubicon), poetry (1988)
 Nezabudni na vílu (Don't Forget the Good Fairy), children's literature (1991)
 Mytológia súkromia (Mythology of Privacy), essay (1994)
 Hriech (Sin), poetry (1996)
 Jazyky z draka. Mytológia slovenských rozprávok (The Tongues from a Dragon. The Mythology of Slovakian Fairy Tales), essay (2002)
 Zielpunkt. Mýtus o vernosti (Zielpunkt. The Myth of Faithfulness), essay (2005)
 Hysteria Siberiana, essay  (2009)
 Mávnutie krídel (42 haiku od 11 slovenských básnikov) (The Wave of Wings (42 haiku by 11 Slovak poets)), haiku anthology, with others (2011)

References 

1954 births
Living people
Slovak poets
Slovak women poets
Slovak journalists
20th-century Slovak women writers
20th-century Slovak writers
20th-century poets
21st-century Slovak women writers
Slovak essayists
Women essayists
Slovak women journalists
Slovak children's writers
Slovak women children's writers
21st-century Slovak writers